This is a comprehensive discography of the record label, Tooth & Nail Records, and its imprints, BEC Recordings, Solid State Records, and Uprok Records.

1990s

2000s

2010s

References 

Discographies of American record labels